Newby is a civil parish in the Eden District, Cumbria, England.  It contains 14 listed buildings that are recorded in the National Heritage List for England.  Of these, two are listed at Grade II*, the middle of the three grades, and the others are at Grade II, the lowest grade.  The parish includes the village of Newby and the surrounding countryside.  Most of the listed buildings are houses and associated structures, farmhouses and farm buildings, the other listing buildings consisting of the walls and memorials of a Friends' burial ground.

Key

Buildings

References

Citations

Sources

Lists of listed buildings in Cumbria